Malcolm Ross may refer to:

 Malcolm Ross (balloonist) (1919–1985), American record-setting balloonist
 Malcolm Ross (courtier) (1943–2019), Lord Prior of the Most Venerable Order of the Hospital of Saint John of Jerusalem
 Malcolm Ross (journalist) (1862–1930), New Zealand journalist, mountaineer, and war correspondent
 Malcolm Ross (linguist) (born 1942), Australian specialist in Austronesian and Papuan linguistics
 Malcolm Ross (literary critic) (1911–2002), Canadian literary critic
 Malcolm Ross (musician) (born 1960), Scottish musician in band Josef K
 Malcolm Ross (school teacher) (born 1946), Canadian Holocaust-denier